G. Elliott Morris is an American data journalist for The Economist. He is best known for his work on election polling and predictive analytics.

Early life
Morris graduated from the University of Texas at Austin in 2018, with undergraduate degrees in government and history. While still an undergrad, Morris became the "breakout star of the 2018 election" for his project models correctly predicting that the Democrats would regain the House.

Career
After graduating from the University of Texas at Austin, Morris began working for The Economist. In February 2020, Morris referred to bad 2016 election predictions as "lying to people" and "editorial malpractice". He later said that polls in 2016 did not account for education, meaning college educated voters were over-represented, which overstated the lead that Hillary Clinton actually had.

In March 2020, Morris and The Economist published a 2020 United States presidential election forecast, the first major model predicting the election's outcome. On August 1, his model gave Joe Biden an 87 percent chance of winning the election, drawing criticism from Nate Silver of FiveThirtyEight, who said "I am not necessarily convinced. It's not just that polls could move. It's a question of, like, how well can pollsters predict turnout when the mechanics of voting have really changed?" Morris has had a public feud with Nate Silver, leading to Silver blocking him on Twitter.

Bibliography
Strength in Numbers: How Polls Work and Why We Need Them (2022)

See also
Nate Silver
Nate Cohn

References 

Living people
Online journalists
Data journalists
American bloggers
American male journalists
American political commentators
American political writers
American statisticians
University of Texas at Austin alumni
The Economist people
Year of birth missing (living people)